Rhinogobius carpenteri is a freshwater species of goby endemic to the Philippines.  It grows up to  SL, and is dull yellow-brown, whitish under the jaw, eyes blue, grayish fins with two silvery white anterior spines, silvery white anal fin rays, with the caudal fins shading to dusky at the tip.  Its common name in the Philippines is kuchu.  The species was named for the co-collector of the cotypes, Mr. W. D. Carpenter.  In 1927, Albert William Christian Theodore Herre erected a new genus in the family Gobiidae, Tukugobius and moved R. carpenteri into it as the type species, but the genus was later rendered invalid.

Size
This species reaches a length of

Etymology
The fish is named in honor of American naturalist William Dorr Carpenter (1879-1958), who helped collect the type specimen.

References

carpenteri
Freshwater fish of the Philippines
Endemic fauna of the Philippines
Taxa named by Alvin Seale
Fish described in 1910